La Asunta is a location in the La Paz Department in Bolivia. It is the seat of the La Asunta Municipality, the fifth municipal section of the Sud Yungas Province.

References 

Populated places in La Paz Department (Bolivia)